, also known as Nathan Spencer in certain games, is a fictional character created by Capcom and the protagonist of the Bionic Commando series. Nathan Spencer is a prototype bionics-enhanced soldier who is mainly noted by video game reviewers due to his "Bionic Arm" (one of the earliest grappling hooks in video games) and (for most of his early video games) his inability to jump. Outside the Bionic Commando series, the character appeared in the Marvel vs. Capcom series. Nathan's design changed since his introduction, receiving both praise and criticism.

Design and characteristics
Over the course of the Bionic Commando, Nathan Spencer's appearance has undergone a number of changes, but he has maintained his distinctive Bionic Arm, which he employs as a weapon and a grappling hook. In his first iteration, Bionic Commando, the main character had wild blue hair, a green vest, and silver pants with blue boots. While he was an anonymous protagonist in the Japanese version, some localized Arcade flyers called him Super Joe, although he would later be a supporting character in the Bionic Commando series.

The player character would return in the Nintendo Entertainment System (NES) version of Bionic Commando, where he was first given his full name. Although this iteration portrayed Spencer as having red spiky hair, sunglasses and green military fatigues, the packaging artwork for the North American version shows a different portrayal in which his dark red hair is much lighter and combed to the side, and a futuristic red and blue suit replaces his military uniform. The European version had an even further sci-fi inspired outfit, with a plain green suit with massive yellow boots and gloves, and short blonde hair. Though the artwork depicted a much different character, the sprites used for Spencer in-game remained the same.

In the Game Boy version of Bionic Commando, the spelling of Spencer's first name was changed from "Ladd" to "Rad". Spencer's design in the Game Boy version uses futuristic cues and combine them with the prior design from the NES. The result was that of an armored Rad Spencer with a red undersuit and dark red hair. Each of these iterations depicted Spencer as a playful, cynical character. Throughout all of these early iterations, Spencer is depicted as having a detachable grappling device, and not a full bionic limb which would be seen in later games.

Bionic Commando Rearmed, a remake of the NES game, reused his military-esque appearance with minor visual upgrades by concept artist Shinkiro. In redesigning Spencer for Rearmed, GRIN cited the characters Iceman from the movie Top Gun and Marty McFly from the Back to the Future series as visual influences for his new appearance. Notable changes include his characteristic spiky hair being reduced to a crew cut in this version, as well as his Bionic Arm now firmly established to be on his left side and having been redesigned to look more mechanical and menacing. The next chronological title in the series Bionic Commando Rearmed 2, would again alter Spencer's appearance slightly. The character was given a different uniform, his hair was streaked back, and he was given a mustache to resemble an older form of the original NES design. His once clean, silver Bionic Arm is now a darker, bulker, and grittier version of the original as seen in Rearmed. The events of this game would lead to multiple changes in both his appearance and personality later in the series.

His most drastic change is arguably his current appearance, which was set forth in the 2009 3D action game. Nathan is missing his trademark sunglasses and his usual red hair is now reprogrammed as brown tied in dreadlocks, although the player can unlock the Rearmed incarnation as a replacement for this game's facelift. In the official webcomic Bionic Commando: Chain of Command, Spencer is shown being given this drastic appearance after having spent five solitary years in prison. The character is voiced by Faith No More singer Mike Patton, and is depicted as an ex-convict, framed for crimes involving his bionic abilities. The resulting character is much more bitter than his previous iterations, often angry and prone to using profanity. This appearance was also used in Capcom's fighting game Marvel vs. Capcom 3: Fate of Two Worlds, except now he is voiced by Dameon Clarke in English and Takaya Kuroda in Japanese. Spencer reappears as a playable character in Marvel vs. Capcom Infinite.

Naming
Only the first name is mentioned in the English-language NES version of Bionic Commando, where it was rendered as "Ladd" instead of the now conventional "Rad". The full name and spelling of "Rad Spencer" would be used for the first time in the English localization of the Game Boy version. In Bionic Commando Rearmed, the character's name was changed to "Nathan Spencer", with "Rad" now being his nickname (which is established to be derived from Research & Development). This change would carry over to the 2009 sequel and Spencer's appearance in Marvel vs. Capcom 3.

Reception

The character has received mixed reactions from critics over the years. In 2012, Game Informer staff named Spencer as one of their "Ten Video Game Characters We Hate Playing As". The staff cited his frailty to environmental hazards in comparison to the perception given to the player of making him superhero-esque. Games Radar's Brett Elston had similar views in regards to the 2009 re-imaging of Spencer. While he conceded that some changes were welcome he criticized the character's long hair and "gruff M-rated voicover". He later praised his new arm, saying: "Sure is cooler than the other, less sucky version". However, the GamesRadar's staff included the fact that his arm is his wife in the category "Stupidest plot twist, possibly ever" at "The Anti-Awards 2009".

Jesse Schedeen of IGN named Spencer second in their top 15 video game commandos. Schedeen jokingly stated that Spencer's inability to jump in earlier games was simply that "he just doesn't see the need when his bionic arm can do all the commando-ing for him." In 2013, Complex ranked Nathan Spencer at number 25 on the list of the greatest soldiers in video games. Joystick Division ranked Fire Emblems Marth third in its article about what Brawl characters should be replaced, citing Rad as his substitute. Game Informer chose him as one of the 20 Capcom characters they would like to see in a rumored crossover fighting game Namco Vs Capcom, his Namco side equivalent being Monkey from Enslaved: Odyssey to the West since both of them are "solitary, brooding protagonists [and] use their impressive agility to scamper around environments." GamesRadar included him in the 2013 list of "The 30 best Capcom characters of the last 30 years" because of his ability of swinging around instead of jumping.

References

External links

Official Bionic Commando website

Action video game characters
Amputee characters in video games
Bionic Commando
Capcom protagonists
Cyborg characters in video games
Fictional gunfighters in video games
Fictional soldiers in video games
Male characters in video games
Fictional mercenaries in video games
Science fiction video game characters
Video game characters introduced in 1987
Video game characters with superhuman strength